Saint Joan may refer to:

People 
 Joan of Arc (c. 1412–1431)
 Joanna, Princess of Portugal (1452–1490), beatified Portuguese royalty, known as the Princess Saint Joan in Portugal
 Joan of France, Duchess of Berry (1464–1505), Saint Joan of Valois
 Joan of Lestonnac (1556–1640), Saint Joanna of Toulouse, Jeanne de Lestonnac
 Saint Jeanne Delanoue (1666–1736)

Film and theatre 
 Saint Joan (play), by George Bernard Shaw
 Saint Joan (1957 film), adaptation directed by Otto Preminger
 Saint Joan (1967 film), a 1967 American TV film

See also
Sant Joan (disambiguation)
Saint Joanna
 A "shade of Joanna," "saint Joanna," mentioned in Thomas Moore's parody poem "The Canonization of Saint Butterworth"
saint Jane Frances de Chantal